The eighth series of The Bill, a British television drama, consisted of 105 episodes, broadcast between 2 January – 31 December 1992. The series was released on DVD for the first time on 6 June 2012, in Australia. It features the above artwork, which features images of PC Steve Loxton and DC Mike Dashwood.

Cast changes

Arrivals
 DC Alan Woods (Episode 56-)
 WPC Polly Page (Episode 83-)
 PC Gary McCann (Episode 90-)

Departures
 DCI Kim Reid - Promoted to Detective Superintendent of MS15
 WPC Suzanne Ford - Unexplained 
 WPC Delia French - Unexplained 
 Sgt. Alec Peters - Retired
 DC Mike Dashwood - Transferred to the Antiques Squad

Episodes
{| class="wikitable plainrowheaders" style="width:100%; margin:auto; background:#FFFFFF;"
|-style="color:black"
! style="background-color:#66FFAA;" width="20"|#
! style="background-color:#66FFAA;" width="150"|Title
! style="background-color:#66FFAA;" width="230"|Episode notes
! style="background-color:#66FFAA;" width="140"|Directed by
! style="background-color:#66FFAA;" width="150"|Written by
! style="background-color:#66FFAA;" width="100"|Original air date

|}

1992 British television seasons
The Bill series